Lo zio indegno (internationally released as The Sleazy Uncle) is a 1989 Italian comedy film directed by Franco Brusati.  Vittorio Gassman was awarded a Nastro d'Argento Best Actor for his portrayal of Uncle Luca.

Cast 
Vittorio Gassman: Uncle Luca
Giancarlo Giannini: Riccardo
Andréa Ferréol: Teresa
Kim Rossi Stuart:	Andrea
Beatrice Palme: La Chanteuse
Simona Cavallari:	Marina
Stefania Sandrelli: Isabella 
Caterina Boratto

References

External links

1989 films
Commedia all'italiana
Films directed by Franco Brusati
Italian comedy films
1989 comedy films
1980s Italian films